Jin Wen or Jinwen may refer to:

Chinese bronze inscriptions, Chinese scripts on ritual bronzes from around 1000 BC
Jinwen University of Science and Technology, a university in New Taipei, Taiwan
Jinhua–Wenzhou railway, colloquially known as Jin-Wen railway, railway in Zhejiang, China

People
Marquis Wen of Jin (805–746 BC), ruler of Jin during the Spring and Autumn period
Duke Wen of Jin (697–628 BC), ruler of Jin during the Spring and Autumn period
Raden Patah (1455–1518), Javanese sultan of Demak Sultanate, possibly of Chinese ancestry, known as Jin Bun or Jin Wen in Chinese

See also
Jing Wen (born 1993), Chinese fashion model